The Wulff construction is a method to determine the equilibrium shape of a droplet or crystal of fixed volume inside a separate phase (usually its saturated solution or vapor). Energy minimization arguments are used to show that certain crystal planes are preferred over others, giving the crystal its shape.

Theory
In 1878 Josiah Willard Gibbs proposed that a droplet or crystal will arrange itself such that its surface Gibbs free energy is minimized by assuming a shape of low surface energy. He defined the quantity

This quantity is therefore the energy associated with the surface.

In 1901 Russian scientist George Wulff stated (without proof) that the length of a vector drawn normal to a crystal face  will be proportional to its surface energy : . The vector  is the "height" of the th face, drawn from the center of the crystal to the face; for a spherical crystal this is simply the radius. This is known as the Gibbs-Wulff theorem.

In 1953 Herring gave a proof of the theorem and a method for determining the equilibrium shape of a crystal, consisting of two main exercises. To begin, a polar plot of surface energy as a function of orientation is made. The second part is the Wulff construction itself in which the gamma plot is used to determine graphically which crystal faces will be present. It can be determined graphically by drawing lines from the origin to every point on the gamma plot. A plane perpendicular to the normal  is drawn at each point where it intersects the gamma plot. The inner envelope of these planes forms the equilibrium shape of the crystal.

Proof
Various proofs of the theorem have been given by Hilton, Liebman, Laue, Herring, and a rather extensive treatment by Cerf. The following is after the method of R. F. Strickland-Constable.
We begin with the surface energy for a crystal

which is the product of the surface energy per unit area times the area of each face, summed over all faces. This is minimized for a given volume when

Surface free energy, being an intensive property, does not vary with volume. We then consider a small change in shape for a constant volume. If a crystal were nucleated to a thermodynamically unstable state, then the change it would undergo afterward to approach an equilibrium shape would be under the condition of constant volume. By definition of holding a variable constant, the change must be zero, . Then by expanding  in terms of the surface areas  and heights  of the crystal faces, one obtains
,
which can be written, by applying the product rule, as
.
The second term must be zero, that is,

This is because, if the volume is to remain constant, the changes in the heights of the various faces must be such that when multiplied by their surface areas the sum is zero. If there were only two surfaces with appreciable area, as in a pancake-like crystal, then . In the pancake instance,  on premise. Then by the condition, . This is in agreement with a simple geometric argument considering the pancake to be a cylinder with very small aspect ratio. The general result is taken here without proof. This result imposes that the remaining sum also equal 0, 

Again, the surface energy minimization condition is that

These may be combined, employing a constant of proportionality  for generality, to yield 

The change in shape  must be allowed to be arbitrary, which then requires that , which then proves the Gibbs-Wulff Theorem.

References

Thermodynamics
Crystallography